Tasmima Hossain (born 1951) is a Jatiya Party politician and a former Jatiya Sangsad member representing the Pirojpur-2 constituency. She is the editor of Daily Ittefaq and Anannya ( Magazine ).

Early life
Hossain was born in 1951 in Dhaka, East Bengal, Pakistan. She is originally from Gendaria.

Career
Hossain was elected to Parliament in 1996 from Pirojpur-2 as a Jatiya Party candidate. In 1988, she was made the editor of Anannya magazine. He was a founding member of Breaking the Silence, a non profit, and its chairperson for a number of years. In 2014, she became the Deputy Editor of The Daily Ittefaq. On 4 July 2018, she was made the Editor of The Daily Ittefaq.

Personal life
Hossain is married to Anwar Hossain Manju, the publisher of The Daily Ittefaq. Hossain's youngest daughter, Anushay Hossain, is a journalist and political analyst based in the United States.

References

Living people
1951 births
Jatiya Party politicians
7th Jatiya Sangsad members